Kędzierzyn  is a village in the administrative district of Gmina Niechanowo, within Gniezno County, Greater Poland Voivodeship, in west-central Poland.

History
Kędzierzyn was a private church village, administratively located in the Gniezno County in the Kalisz Voivodeship in the Greater Poland Province of the Polish Crown.

During the German occupation of Poland (World War II), in 1940, the occupiers carried out expulsions of Poles, who were deported in freight trains to the General Government (German-occupied central Poland), while their farms were then handed over to Germans as part of the Lebensraum policy.

References

Villages in Gniezno County